Abdul Cader Shahul Hameed (10 April 1927  – 3 September 1999) was a Sri Lankan diplomat and  prominent political figure. He served as Minister of Foreign Affairs of Sri Lanka from 1977 to 1989; and from 1993 to 1994. In the intervening period he was Minister of Justice & Higher Education of Sri Lanka.

Born on 10 April 1927 in Kurugoda, Akurana, he was educated at St. Anthony's College, Katugastota; Vijay College, Matale and Zahira College, Matale. Joining the United National Party in 1956 and contested the March 1960 general election from Akurana and was elected to parliament. He was re-elected in all the consecutive elections and in 1970 changed his electorate to Harispattuwa and was re-elected until his death. In 1978, he was appointed the first Minister of Foreign Affairs, which had been held by the Prime Minister since 1948. He served as Foreign Minister till 1989, becoming the longest serving Foreign Minister in Sri Lanka. From 1989 to 1993 he served as Justice Minister from 1989 to 1993 before taking over as Foreign Minister from 1993 to 1994. Remained a member of the opposition until his death on 3 September 1999. He had been awarded honorary doctorates from the Hankuk University and the University of Sri Jayawardenepura.

See also
 Ministry of Foreign Affairs (Sri Lanka)
 List of St. Anthony's College, Kandy alumni

References

External links
  A.C.S. Hameed, an exemplar of national unity

1927 births
1999 deaths
Foreign ministers of Sri Lanka
United National Party politicians
Members of the 4th Parliament of Ceylon
Members of the 5th Parliament of Ceylon
Members of the 6th Parliament of Ceylon
Members of the 7th Parliament of Ceylon
Members of the 8th Parliament of Sri Lanka
Members of the 9th Parliament of Sri Lanka
Members of the 10th Parliament of Sri Lanka
Alumni of St. Anthony's College, Kandy
Justice ministers of Sri Lanka
Sri Lankan Muslims
Non-cabinet ministers of Sri Lanka
Higher education ministers of Sri Lanka